The Korean Basketball League Ethnic Draft was first established in 2009 to give mixed blood Korean basketball players of foreign nationality a chance to play in the KBL without being counted as foreigners. The first draft was held on 3 February 2009 and it resulted in five out of seven applicants being picked. The following year, another draft was held but only one player was selected.

Rules
Each team is allowed to have only one player from the ethnic draft at any given time. The drafted players can play a maximum of three years with the KBL team that drafted them.

2009 Draft Picks

2010 Draft Picks

2011 Draft Picks
The third Ethnic Draft was held on 31 January 2011. However, none of the eligible candidates were picked. Adrian Scott, Larry Boyd, Joseph Fontenot, and Anthony Gallagher were the eligible players.

References

Korean Basketball League draft